
Lanjiao One (Chinese: 碗礁一号, Lanjiao yihao) is an ancient Chinese merchant ship that sank off the coast of Pingtan County of Fujian Province, China. Loaded with more than 10,000 pieces of blue-and-white porcelain dating back to the reign of the Kangxi Emperor (1654-1722) in the Qing dynasty (1644-1911), it was discovered in 2005 and the shipwreck was fully excavated in 2008.

See also
Nanhai One
Nan'ao One

References

Literature
Wanjiao No. 1 Underwater Archaeology Team: Donghai Pingtan Wanjiao yihao chushui ciqi 东海平潭碗礁一号出水瓷器 碗礁一号水下考古队 (Porcelain from the shipwreck no. 1 of the Wanjiao Reefs from Pingtan in the South China Sea) Beijing (2006),

External links
Ancient Porcelain Clue to Maritime Silk Road at China.org.cn

Shipwrecks in the South China Sea
Ships of China